Réka Jakab (born 5 February 1987 in Győr) is a Hungarian football midfielder, currently playing for Győri Dózsa in Női NB I. She has also played for 1. FC Femina, with whom she took part in the 2007-08 UEFA Women's Cup. She is a member of the Hungarian national team.

References

1987 births
Living people
Hungarian women's footballers
Hungary women's international footballers
1. FC Femina players
Viktória FC-Szombathely players
Sportspeople from Győr
Women's association football midfielders